Javee Dimalanta Mocon (born April 7, 1995) is a Filipino professional basketball player for the Phoenix Super LPG Fuel Masters of the Philippine Basketball Association (PBA). He played college basketball for the San Beda Red Lions in the NCAA. He plays both the small forward position.

High school career
Mocon, coached by the renowned Edmundo "Ato" Badolato, started playing for the San Beda’s team in the boys' leagues. On his junior year, he joined and played for the San Beda Red Cubs in the NCAA from 2011 up to 2013. In all of those years, Mocon has won the juniors' basketball championship, with two out of the three seasons (87, 89), the Red Cubs swept all 18 elimination round games to qualify outright to the finals with the thrice to beat advantage. In season 88, the Red Cubs lost only one game to the Malayan Red Robins (60–64), ending the elimination round with a 17-1 record.

College career
Mocon, stayed with his alma mater and suited up for the Red Lions in 2014. He was part of the San Beda Red Lions team who won the title, San Beda's 5th consecutive, its eighth title in the past nine years and 19th overall men's basketball crown.

According to a Slam Philippines article during his rookie season, "he’s a legit 6’4” forward with low post footwork, he is a mean slasher off the triple-threat stance, and he has a respectable 15 foot jumper especially from the elbows. His rebounding and inside defense have been superb in the juniors, and that’s what he expects to contribute right away to the defending 4-peat NCAA champs."

In his second year with the Red Lions, under new head coach Jamike Jarin, they fell short of securing a rare six-peat championship crown, ending as the runners-up in 2015. In an interview with Fox Sports, he stated, “I don’t want to remember that feeling and ‘yun ang motivation ko, sobrang sakit talaga nung matalo kami sa Letran, archrival pa namin."

Professional career
In the 2018 PBA Draft, the Rain or Shine Elasto Painters drafted him with the 6th pick. In his PBA debut back on January 18, 2019, Mocon helped Rain or Shine on an 96–87 win over the NLEX Road Warriors. He finished the game with 13 points and 5 rebounds. On February 1, he grabbed a career-high 17 rebounds in a win against the San Miguel Beermen. For the month of February, he beat CJ Perez for Rookie of the Month, leading his team to a perfect record for that month. He also played in that season's Rookies vs. Sophomores game, scoring the game-winning tip-in basket. He won another Rookie of the Month award, this time for July. He ended the year as a member of the All-Rookie Team.

In Mocon's second season, he scored a career high 25 points on 7-of-9 shooting in a win also against the Beermen.

In March 2022, he became a restricted free agent. On June 7, his rights were traded to the Phoenix Super LPG Fuel Masters for Nick Demusis and two future draft picks. Hours later, Mocon officially signed a three-year deal with Phoenix Super LPG.

PBA career statistics

As of the end of 2021 season

Season-by-season averages

|-
| align=left | 
| align=left | Rain or Shine
| 48 || 27.1 || .369 || .278 || .775 || 6.7 || 2.6 || .6 || .5 || 10.1
|-
| align=left | 
| align=left | Rain or Shine
| 12 || 34.4 || .348 || .283 || .795 || 7.0|| 2.7 || 1.2 || 1.2 || 12.0
|-
| align=left | 
| align=left | Rain or Shine
| 24 || 32.7 || .350 || .320 || .691 || 7.5 || 3.4 || 1.2 || .4 || 11.8
|-class=sortbottom
| align="center" colspan=2 | Career
| 84 || 29.7 || .360 || .291 || .756 || 7.0 || 2.9 || .8 || .6 || 10.9

Notes

References

External links

1995 births
Living people
Basketball players from Pampanga
Filipino men's basketball players
Kapampangan people
People from Guagua
Phoenix Super LPG Fuel Masters players
Rain or Shine Elasto Painters draft picks
Rain or Shine Elasto Painters players
San Beda Red Lions basketball players
Small forwards